The R937 road is a  long regional road in Ireland which links the N2  with Monaghan in County Monaghan.

See also 

 Roads in Ireland
 National primary road
 National secondary road

References 

Regional roads in the Republic of Ireland
Roads in County Monaghan